Seeta bint Fahd Al Damir (25 June 1922 – 25 December 2012) was one of the spouses of King Khalid of Saudi Arabia.

Early life
Seeta bint Fahd was a member of the Ajman tribe based in Al Badiyah and a niece of Wasmiyah Al Damir, wife of Abdullah bin Jiluwi. Her parents were Fahd bin Abdullah Al Damir and Raisa Shehitan Al Dhaen Al Ajami. She had two brothers and five sisters. Her brother, Abdullah bin Fahd, was the leader of the Juda settlement of the Ajman tribe.

Personal life
Seeta bint Fahd married King Khalid. They had seven children: Jawhara, Nouf, Moudi, Hussa, Al Bandari, Mishaal and Faisal. Her daughter, Moudi bint Khalid, was a member of the Consultative Assembly between 2013 and 2016.

Death
Seeta bint Fahd died in Riyadh on 25 December 2012. The funeral ceremony was held after Asr prayer led by Abdulaziz Al Asheikh at Imam Turki bin Abdullah Mosque in Riyadh on 26 December 2012 with the attendance of senior Saudi officials, including Crown Prince Salman bin Abdulaziz.

References

Seeta
Seeta
1922 births
2012 deaths
Princesses by marriage
Seeta
Seeta